Toy Dixon Savage Jr. (October 12, 1921 – December 7, 2017) was an American lawyer and politician who represented Norfolk, Virginia in the Virginia House of Delegates. He was the president of the Virginia Bar Association from 1969 to 1970.

References

External links

1921 births
2017 deaths
Politicians from Norfolk, Virginia
United States Navy personnel of World War II
Virginia Democrats
20th-century American politicians